Talent has two principal meanings:
 Talent (measurement), an ancient unit of mass and value
 Talent (skill), a group of aptitudes useful for some activities; talents may refer to aptitudes themselves or to possessors of those talents

Talent may also refer to:

Arts, entertainment, and media

Literature 
 Talent (play), a 1978 play by Victoria Wood
 Talent, the first novel in The Talent Series by Zoey Dean

Television 
 Got Talent, a series of television shows, in several national versions
 Young Talent Time (1971-1989; 2012), an Australian television variety program on Network Ten

Other arts, entertainment, and media
 Talent (artwork), a seminal work of art by David Robbins, 1986
 Talent (comics), a comic book series written by Christopher Golden and Tom Sngoski and drawn by Paul Azaceta, 2006
 Billy Talent, a Canadian rock group from Toronto, who formed in 1993
 Talents universe, a setting in Anne McCaffrey's science fiction, where Talents are members of the fictional psionic professions
"Hidden Talent", an episode of Kim Possible's second season

Other uses 
 Attic talent, also known as the Athenian talent or Greek talent, an ancient unit of mass or value equal to this amount of pure silver
 Talent (horse), a racehorse
 Bombardier Talent, a type of multiple unit passenger train manufactured by Bombardier
 Talent, Oregon, a city in Jackson County, Oregon, United States
 Jim Talent (born 1956), American politician, former Senator from Missouri
 Human capital, as in talent management
 People who work in entertainment or broadcasting, as in talent agent
 Talent Scheduling, an optimization problem in computer science and operations research.

See also